Chiayi's legislative districts consist of 2 single-member constituencies, each represented by a member of the Republic of China Legislative Yuan.

Current districts
Chiayi County Constituency 1 - Lioujiao, Dongshi, Puzi, Budai, Yizhu, Lucao, Shuishang Townships, Taibao City
Chiayi County Constituency 2 - Xikou, Dalin, Meishan, Xingang, Chaozhou, Zhuqi, Zhongpu, Fanlu, Alishan, Dapu Townships

Legislators

 Helen Chang resigned in 2009 after elected Chiayi County magistrate.

Election results

References

Constituencies in Taiwan
Chiayi County